Mecynorhina (frequently misspelled as Mecynorrhina; the original spelling used a single "r" and the misspelling is not in prevailing usage, therefore not valid under the ICZN) are beetles from the subfamily Cetoniinae, tribe Goliathini. The genus was created by Frederick William Hope, in 1837.

According to the last work of De Palma & Frantz, the type species of the genus is Scarabaeus polyphemus Fabricius, 1781.

The genus is spread throughout the tropical African region.

Taxonomy

Former classification 
Formerly there were three species in the genus Mecynorhina:
 Mecynorhina oberthueri (Fairmaire, 1903)
 Mecynorhina torquata (Drury, 1782)
 Mecynorhina ugandensis (Moser, 1907)
Some authors designated ugandensis as a subspecies of torquata.

Mecynorhina oberthuri was long thought to be the rarest species in its genus, however, Jean-Pierre Lequeux discovered that it is common in the forests of Tanzania. This species is now reared by many amateurs.

The most variable species is Mecynorhina ugandensis where rarely two specimens are of the same aspect. Many variations have been illustrated by Allard.

Current classification 
Following De Palma & Frantz (l.c.), the genus is now divided in five subgenera: 
 Mecynorhina Hope, 1837  
 Mecynorhina polyphemus (Fabricius, 1781)
 Mecynorrhinella Marais & Holm, 1992
 Mecynorhina oberthueri Fairmaire, 1903
 Mecynorhina torquata (Drury, 1782)
 Mecynorhina ugandensis (Moser, 1907) (often treated as a subspecies of Mecynorhina torquata)
 Chelorhinella De Palma & Frantz, 2010
 Mecynorhina kraatzi (Moser, 1905)
 Mecynorhina savagei Harris, 1844
 Megalorhina Westwood, 1847
 Mecynorhina harrisi (Westwood, 1847)
 Mecynorhina mukengiana (Kolbe, 1884) 
 Mecynorhina taverniersi Allard, 1990
 Amaurodes Westwood, 1844 (Synonym = Chelorrhina Burmeister, 1842)
 Mecynorhina passerinii (Westwood, 1844)

References

 Chelorrhina

Cetoniinae